Mostafa Lachal is a Moroccan Olympic middle-distance runner. He represented his country in the men's 1500 meters at the 1992 Summer Olympics. His time was a 3:39.20 in the first heat, and a 3:45.65 in the semifinals.

References

1964 births
Living people
Moroccan male middle-distance runners
Olympic athletes of Morocco
Athletes (track and field) at the 1988 Summer Olympics